The Norrköping class were a group of fast attack craft built for the Swedish Navy in the 1970s. Twelve ships were built, with the last ship decommissioned in 2005. The boats have also been called the Spica II class and were named after Swedish cities.

Design

The initial design was a version of the earlier Spica-class torpedo boat with some minor changes.

Machinery

The power train was identical to the preceding class and comprised three Bristol Proteus gas turbine engines driving three propellers

Armament

The initial armament was identical to the Spica class, comprising a Bofors 57 mm gun and six  torpedo tubes. There was a refit programme in 1982–1985, where four launchers for RBS-15 anti-ship missiles replaced four torpedo tubes. Mines could be carried in place of the torpedoes or missiles. The 1982 refit also included new sensors (Sea Giraffe radar) and a new weapons control system (Maris 880).

Ystad class modernisation

Six boats were modernised between 1996 and 2000 with new fire control systems and other electronics. The boats were originally set to be operated until 2010 but they were taken out of service early due to financial reasons with HSwMS Ystad decommissioning in 2005.

Royal Malaysian Navy

These ships had an all diesel power plant, with a revised superstructure design, different electronics and Exocet missiles.

Ships

All ships were built by Karlskrona Dockyard

References

Torpedo boats of the Swedish Navy
Torpedo boat classes
Torpedo boats of the Cold War
Missile boat classes
Ships built in Karlskrona